A declaration of love, also known as a confession of love, is a form of expressing one's love for someone or something. It can be presented in various forms, such as love letters, speeches, or love songs. A love declaration is more often than not explicit and straightforward.

A declaration of love from one person to another is "a statement made by one person to another in which they say they are in love with the other person."

Examples in art and literature

One widely referenced declaration of love comes from Shakespeare's Romeo and Juliet. In the balcony scene, Juliet declares her love for Romeo who stands outside her window:

Romeo subsequently declares his love for Juliet to her, making it a declaration of mutual consent—an accepted love declaration—where both partners are in love.

An example of a less-successful declaration of love can be found in Jane Austen's Pride and Prejudice where Darcy declares his love for Elisabeth: "In vain have I struggled. It will not do. My feelings will not be repressed. You must allow me to tell you how ardently I admire and love you."

As it is a confession as well as a declaration, it comes as quite a shock to Elisabeth, who does not return Darcy's confession of love. However, she says she feels "a sense of obligation for the sentiments avowed, however unequally they may be returned." She adds that she has "never desired [his] good opinion" and that he has "certainly bestowed it most unwillingly," making it clear that his declaration is unwanted as well as unsuccessful.

Historical occurrences
In the oldest existing text written in Icelandic, a faded and near illegible runic inscription from the 10. or 11. century, the word “ást” appears, which directly translates as love. It is speculated the author of the text was declaring their love for something.

Non verbal declarations

Love letters

A love letter is one of the most classical forms of non-verbal declarations of feelings of love. It allows for more specificity and a clearer point as the author of a love letter has time to think, rephrase, and edit the contents of his heart.

Permanent marks
Declarations of love can surface as permanent marks on urban environments and nature. They are considered vandalism by many municipalities and governments. When a declaration of love is made, it is often attempted to be made permanent. If the declaration is permanent it is considered everlasting or eternal.

A good example of this is love locks, padlocks attached to landmarks, and constructions with the names of lovers engraved or written on them. They began appearing on the Pont des Arts bridge in Paris as early as 2008. They have since then become a widespread phenomenon. Now considered vandalism in many places around the world, they are regularly removed. An open petition has been made for them to be banned in Paris.

Another example are lovers’ arborglyphs, carvings in living trees. A popular romantic image, they are known to spread disease between Beech trees.

References

External links
Love in a Conjugal Relationship

Love
Romance